Serhiy Anatoliyovych Pohodin (born 29 April 1968) is a Ukrainian professional football coach and a former player.

Club career
He made his debut in the Soviet Second League in 1985 for FC Zarya Voroshilovgrad. He played 1 game and scored 1 goal in the 1993–94 UEFA Champions League qualification for FC Spartak Moscow against Skonto FC.

International
Invited to play for the CIS national football team, the FFU vice-president Yevhen Kotelnykov insisted that Pohodin should participate in the debut game of the Ukraine national football team.

Honours
 Soviet Top League runner-up: 1988.
 Soviet Cup winner: 1990.
 Russian Premier League champion: 1993, 1994.

References

External links

1968 births
People from Rubizhne
Living people
Soviet footballers
Ukrainian footballers
Ukrainian expatriate footballers
Soviet Union under-21 international footballers
Ukraine international footballers
FC Torpedo Zaporizhzhia players
FC Zorya Luhansk players
FC Dynamo Kyiv players
FC Shakhtar Donetsk players
Roda JC Kerkrade players
FC Spartak Moscow players
Hapoel Tel Aviv F.C. players
FC Tytan Donetsk players
Ukrainian football managers
FC Torpedo Zaporizhzhia managers
FC Zorya Luhansk managers
FC Tytan Donetsk managers
Soviet Top League players
Russian Premier League players
Ukrainian Premier League players
Expatriate footballers in Spain
Expatriate footballers in Russia
Expatriate footballers in Israel
Expatriate footballers in the Netherlands
Ukrainian expatriate sportspeople in Spain
Ukrainian expatriate sportspeople in Russia
Ukrainian expatriate sportspeople in Israel
Ukrainian expatriate sportspeople in the Netherlands
Association football forwards
Association football midfielders
Sportspeople from Luhansk Oblast